Melanopolia catori is a species of beetle in the family Cerambycidae. It was described by Karl Jordan in 1903.

Subspecies
 Melanopolia catori catori Jordan, 1903
 Melanopolia catori vittata Dillon & Dillon, 1959

References

Lamiini
Beetles described in 1903